Ruido Blanco (Spanish for White Noise) is a live album recorded by the Argentine rock band Soda Stereo, released in 1987 and recorded on their "Signos" Latin American tour promoting the album of the same name. This album includes a unique track, "Vita-Set", consisting of two songs bonded by their initial chords. Frontman Gustavo Cerati started to hate the song after the tour and it was never played again.

The album's title is taken from a lyric in the song "Prófugos" (off the Signos album): Tus ojos nunca mentirán / pero ese ruido blanco / es una alarma en mis oídos. ("Your eyes will never lie / but that white noise / is an alarm in my ears.")

Track listing

 "Signos" (Cerati) – 6:20
 "Juego de seducción" (Cerati) – 4:14
 "Persiana americana" (Cerati/Daffunchio) – 5:38
 "Sobredosis de TV" (Cerati) – 5:40
 "Estoy azulado" (Cerati/Coleman) – 4:18
 "Final caja negra" (Cerati/Bosio/Ficicchia) – 5:44
 "Cuando pase el temblor" (Cerati) – 5:00
 "Vita-Set: Te Hacen Falta Vitaminas / ¿Por Qué No Puedo Ser Del Jet-Set?" (Cerati/Bosio/Ficicchia) – 4:26
 "Prófugos" (Cerati/Ficicchia) – 6:04

Personnel 
Soda Stereo
 Gustavo Cerati: Guitars, vocals.
 Zeta Bosio: Bass guitar, acoustic guitar, backing vocals.
 Charly Alberti: Drums, percussion.

Additional personnel
 Daniel Sais: Keyboards, vocals.
 The Supremes (1984 group; Mónica Green, Melba Houston, Anita Robinson): Backup vocals.

References 

Soda Stereo albums
1988 live albums
Sony Music Argentina live albums